The 2016 BSWW Mundialito is a beach soccer tournament that takes place at Praia de Carcavelos in Cascais, Portugal, from 29 July to 31 July 2016. This competition with 4 teams was played in a round-robin format.

Participating nations
 (host)

Standings

Schedule and results

Awards

Top scorers

8 goals
 Lucão
6 goals
 José Maria
 Nick Perera
5 goals
 Datinha
 Bruno Xavier
 Bê Martins
4 goals
 Filipe
 Nuno Belchior
3 goals
 Bokinha
 Bruno Novo
2 goals
 Madjer
 Rui Coimbra
 Jason Santos
 Tomas Canale
 Jason Leopoldo
1 goals
 Mauricinho
 Fernando Ddi
 Mão
 Catarino
 Felipe
 Bruno Torres
 Alan
 Adriano dos Santos
 Wan Chao
 Cai Wei Ming

See also
Beach soccer
BSWW Mundialito
Euro Beach Soccer League

References

External links
Beach Soccer Worldwide

BSWW Mundialito
BSW
2016 in beach soccer